Niskala is a Finnish surname. Notable people with the surname include: 

Janne Niskala (born 1981), Finnish ice hockey player
Mika Niskala (born 1981), Finnish footballer

Finnish-language surnames